Amirabad (also Romanized as Amīrābād) is a village in Shirju Posht Rural District, Rudboneh District, Lahijan County, Gilan Province, Iran. At the 2006 census, its population was 391, in 116 families.

References 

Populated places in Lahijan County